William Earl Cain (born September 30, 1933) is a retired American sports administrator who was athletic director of the East Carolina University Pirates from 1975 to 1980.

A native of Rockingham, North Carolina, Cain played football for East Carolina University as an offensive and defensive end from 1957 to 1959. He was co-captain of the 1959 team, earning All-Carolina's conference honors. He earned his bachelor's and master's degrees at ECU. Prior to serving his as athletic director, he was the freshman football coach (1968–70) and the golf and tennis coach (1972–75).

References

1933 births
Living people
East Carolina University alumni
East Carolina Pirates football players
East Carolina Pirates athletic directors
People from Rockingham, North Carolina
Coaches of American football from North Carolina